Kleszczewo  is a village in Poznań County, Greater Poland Voivodeship, in west-central Poland. It is the seat of the gmina (administrative district) called Gmina Kleszczewo.

The village has a population of 430.

References

Villages in Poznań County